George H. Jessop was an Irish playwright, journalist and novelist. Born in Doory Hall, Ballymahon, County Longford, in 1852, he died in Hampstead, London, in 1915. Jessop lived and worked in the United States for many years.

His numerous works included the opera Shamus O'Brien (written with Charles Villiers Stanford) and the novel Gerald Ffrench's Friends. and the plays Sam'l of Pozen (1881); Myles Aroon (1888); A Gold Mine and On Probation, both 1889 with Brander Matthews; Mavourneen (1891); and The Power of the Press (1892) with Augustus Pitou.
He also contributed to the magazines Puck and Judge''.

He was the brother of the Irish writer Mary Kathleen Jessop.

References 

Irish dramatists and playwrights
Irish male dramatists and playwrights
Irish journalists
Irish novelists
Irish librettists
1852 births
1915 deaths
Irish male novelists